Zhilkin is a surname. Notable people with the surname include:

 Alexander Zhilkin (born 1959), Russian politician
 Andrey Zhilkin (born 1995), Russian swimmer
 Grigory Zhilkin (born 2003), Russian footballer